Frank Alexander Montgomery (January 7, 1830 – December 16, 1903) was an American politician best known for his memoir of life as a Confederate cavalry officer in the Western Theater of the American Civil War (1861–1865) called Reminiscences of a Mississippian in Peace and War (1901).

Biography
Frank Alexander Montgomery was born on January 7, 1830, in Adams County, Mississippi, to James Jefferson Montgomery. He was Lieutenant-Colonel of the 1st Mississippi Cavalry Regiment during the American Civil War. He served eight years as a member of the Mississippi House of Representatives and one term as Judge of the Fourth Circuit Court District of Mississippi. He died on December 16, 1903, and is buried at Beulah Cemetery, Bolivar County, Mississippi.

Notable works
Reminiscences of a Mississippian in Peace and War (1901)

See also
List of Allegheny College people
List of people from Mississippi
List of slave owners

References

External links

 
 
 

1830 births
1903 deaths
19th-century American judges
20th-century American male writers
19th-century American memoirists
19th-century American politicians
20th-century American non-fiction writers
Allegheny College alumni
American Civil War prisoners of war
American male non-fiction writers
American slave owners
Burials in Mississippi
Confederate States Army officers
Farmers from Mississippi
Members of the Mississippi House of Representatives
Military personnel from Mississippi
Mississippi Democrats
Mississippi Whigs
People from Adams County, Mississippi
People of Mississippi in the American Civil War
Writers from Mississippi